Zenebework Tadesse (Amharic: ዘነበወርቅ ታደሰ) is an Ethiopian sociologist and activist. She is the first executive director of AAWORD.

Early life and education 
Tadesse was born in Addis Ababa to a Catholic family. Her father worked for the government. She attended a Catholic girls' school, where she was taught by missionary priests. She later studied in the USA, where she spent time in Minnesota and Indiana initially studying journalism, later switching to international relations once she realized that the lack of press freedom in Ethiopia would thwart a journalism career. She moved to Chicago, where she was involved in the civil rights movement and the Black Panthers. She later moved to Harlem.

Career 
Tadesse is an activist and sociologist who has undertaken significant research on democracy, gender and women's land rights in Africa. She has called for more financial support of women, especially with regards to access to education. Tadesse is a founding member of the Ethiopian Forum for Social Sciences, and the principal vice president of the Ethiopian Academy of Sciences.

In 1977, she was a founding member of the Association of African Women for Research and Development, an organization that she became the first executive director of.

Selected publications 
In 1976 she wrote a book, The Condition of Women in Ethiopia, that is held in the Rome headquarters of the FAO, but has not been publicly published.

With Yared Amare, she wrote the paper Women's Land Rights in Ethiopia, published in 2000 in the Journal of Ethiopian Women Lawyers Association (No.1 (Summer): 25-51).

References 

Living people
Ethiopian women activists
People from Addis Ababa
Women founders
Organization founders
20th-century Ethiopian writers
Year of birth missing (living people)